The songs from the 1939 musical fantasy film The Wizard of Oz have taken their place among the most famous and instantly recognizable American songs of all time, and the film's principal song, "Over the Rainbow", is perhaps the most famous song ever written for a film. Music and lyrics were by Harold Arlen and E.Y. "Yip" Harburg, who won an Academy Award for Best Song for "Over the Rainbow."

Herbert Stothart, who underscored the film, won an Academy Award for Best Original Score. Some of that underscoring was, of course, based on Harburg and Arlen's songs. Georgie Stoll was the associate conductor and screen credits were given to George Bassman, Murray Cutter (who did "Over the Rainbow"), Ken Darby and Paul Marquardt for orchestral and vocal arrangements. As usual, Roger Edens was heavily involved as the unbilled musical associate of Freed. Incidental music was contributed by Stoll, Bassman, Robert Stringer and also Conrad Salinger. The music to "Optimistic Voices" was written by Arlen and Stothart.

The songs were recorded in a studio before filming. Several of the recordings were completed while Buddy Ebsen, who was supposed to have played the Tin Man, was still with the cast. So while he had to be dropped from the cast due to illness from the aluminum powder makeup, his singing voice remains on the soundtrack. It is Jack Haley, who eventually played the role, that is seen and heard singing "If I Only Had A Heart", but Ebsen's voice is still heard on the group vocals of "We're Off To See The Wizard". In those vocals, his voice is easy to detect. Ray Bolger (and also Jack Haley) were speakers with a distinct Boston accent and did not pronounce the r in wizard. Buddy Ebsen was a Midwesterner, like Judy Garland, and pronounced the r.

Although an orchestra underscores nearly the entire film, approximately the last third of the movie contains no songs. Once Dorothy and her cohorts are handed the task of killing the Wicked Witch, the mood of the film goes a bit darker. This was not originally intended—the last three songs in the film, "The Jitterbug," the vocal reprise of "Over The Rainbow," and "The Triumphant Return" were all excised from the film before its official release.

Song previews
Most of the songs were first heard on radio on a fifteen-minute program called MGM: Leo Is On the Air a few months prior to the film's release. In what must have been an extremely unusual step at the time, the actual soundtrack versions of the songs were used. Brunswick Records had earlier recorded a single of "Over the Rainbow" as well as "The Jitterbug", a song eventually deleted from the film, but MGM had suppressed the recording because they wanted to preview the songs themselves. The radio preview proved a huge success and, through repeated live radio playings, "Over the Rainbow" soared to the top of the hit parade charts even before audiences saw the film.
An obviously staged "backstage glimpse" at the planning and making of the film, hosted by Robert Young, and featuring Judy Garland, Frank Morgan, lyricist E.Y. Harburg, and composer Harold Arlen, was the subject of an episode of the Good News of 1939 radio program. This program also gave a sneak preview of some of the music, but interspersed it with comedy skits by such artists as Fannie Brice. Brice, in her radio persona of Baby Snooks, was featured in a skit in which Lancelot Higgins (Hanley Stafford) tried to tell her the story of The Wizard of Oz, but was constantly interrupted and almost kept from attending the film's premiere by the toddler, who virtually forced him into taking her along. The entire program, as well as the Leo is On the Air episode, is included as a supplement on the Wizard of Oz DVD.

Albums

1940 Decca Studio Album
The first record album of music from the film was not a soundtrack album in the sense that the term is used today, or even an original cast album, although it is sometimes erroneously called so. It was, instead, a U.S. Decca four-record 78 rpm studio cast album of songs from the film released in 1940, featuring Judy Garland as Dorothy but with the Ken Darby Singers in other roles. Darby had also been one of the film's music arrangers, but the arrangements made for the film were not used in this album. This album was about twenty minutes long. There was no overture or finale included, and most of the songs were not placed in the same order that they were heard in the film. The album also used some introductory song verses which had not been included in the motion picture and were not used in the MGM radio previews. Two songs heard in the film as finally released were omitted from the album - "Optimistic Voices" and "If I Were King of the Forest"; however, the album did include the song "The Jitterbug", which had been deleted from the film. It also used, oddly enough, dialogue which never appeared in the movie; at one point, during "The Merry Old Land of Oz", Dorothy says, "We can't go to see the Wizard like this! We're all dirty!", after which the group supposedly enters the Wash and Brush Up room in the Emerald City. The reprise of "Over the Rainbow" and the "Triumphal Return" sequence were also not included.

The orchestra on the album was conducted by Victor Young. In the "Munchkinland" medley, the Ken Darby Singers provided the voices of the Munchkins, but they were not altered to sound "chipmunk"-like, as in the film. The role of Glinda was sung by an unnamed soprano with an operatic voice, the solo part in "If I Only Had a Brain" was performed by composer Harold Arlen, and in the song "If I Only Had A Heart", the role of the Tin Man was sung by a tenor whose voice bordered on falsetto. The two songs Garland sang on the album, "Over the Rainbow" and "The Jitterbug," had already been released as a 78-rpm single in 1939 only a month after the film's premiere, on a single that had nothing to do with the Brunswick Records recording released by MGM, and were incorporated into the 1940 album.

On the rest of the 1940 album, an unnamed soloist took the role of Dorothy.

This album was quite a success, and after being reissued in a 45-rpm version  and as a 10-inch LP, it was finally re-released in 1956  as one side of a 12-inch 33 rpm LP, the other side occupied by cover versions of songs from Disney's Pinocchio (1940), with Cliff Edwards, the film's Jiminy Cricket, as lead soloist. This is also the year that MGM Records first released an authentic soundtrack album of The Wizard of Oz.

The 1940 Decca "cover album" stayed in print throughout the 1950s, even after MGM Records' authentic soundtrack album of The Wizard of Oz was released. Judy Garland's 1939 cover versions of "Over the Rainbow" and "The Jitterbug" were released years later on the 1994 Decca box set The Complete Decca Masters (plus), which featured all of Garland's Decca singles and several alternate takes. The Decca single of "Over the Rainbow" has been released on an MCA compact disc entitled 20th Century Masters – The Millennium Collection – The Best of Judy Garland, among various other compilations; the entire album was scheduled to be released on CD for the first time in 2014, as part of a 75th anniversary Wizard of Oz collection.

Tracks in the 1940 album, in the order in which they appear:
 Over the Rainbow– Judy Garland, with Victor Young and His Orchestra
 The Jitterbug – Judy Garland with the Ken Darby Singers and Victor Young and his Orchestra 
 Munchkinland Medley (referred to as "Munchkinland" on the label) – The Ken Darby Singers with Victor Young and His Orchestra   (This track originally covered two sides of a 78-rpm record – highly unusual for a musical number from a film.) 
 If I Only Had a Brain – Harold Arlen, soloist, with the Ken Darby Singers; Victor Young and His Orchestra
 If I Only Had a Heart and If I Only Had The Nerve – Ken Darby soloist on "If I Only Had a Heart", with the Ken Darby Singers with Victor Young and His Orchestra
 The Merry Old Land of Oz – The Ken Darby Singers with Victor Young and His Orchestra
 We're Off To See The Wizard – The Ken Darby Singers with Victor Young and His Orchestra

MGM Soundtrack Album
In 1956 – the year that the film was first shown on TV – MGM Records released their own authentic 40-minute LP soundtrack album from the film. This album featured not only most of the songs, but also enough dialogue for listeners to be able to follow the story, almost exactly as heard on the movie soundtrack. There were a few minor revisions in this 1956 edition, i.e. Aunt Em's two lines "Dorothy, please, we're trying to count!" (referring to their farm chickens) and "Dorothy, Dorothy, we're busy!" were turned into the single line "Dorothy, Dorothy, we're busy! Please, we're trying to count!". The songs "Optimistic Voices" and "The Merry Old Land of Oz", and the Tin Man's instrumental dance to "If I Only Had a Heart", were omitted from the LP release; also gone were half of the orchestral main title music, half of the "Munchkinland" medley, the entire Professor Marvel sequence, the moments during the tornado scene during which Dorothy sees people – including Miss Gulch – flying past her window, the talking apple trees scene, the appearance of the witch on the roof of the Tin Man's cottage, the poppy field sequence, the moment when the Lion reads "Surrender Dorothy" in the sky, and the scene in the Haunted Forest in which the Tin Man is mysteriously lifted into the air. Also gone was the moment in which the Scarecrow says, "They tore my legs off, and they threw them over there", and the Tin Man answers, "Well, that's you all over", and the scene in which Dorothy's friends are scaling the cliff to get to the witch's castle, as well as many other tiny bits from the film.  Perhaps most interesting was the total elimination of any reference to the Ruby Slippers, a very significant and pivotal part of the film.

This soundtrack recording eventually supplanted the 1940 studio album. Throughout the 1960s, 1970s, and 1980s, it was constantly reprinted and re-released (each time with different cover art), and the album eventually appeared in an expanded version on CD in 1989, released by CBS Records instead of MGM. The 1989 release also contained the original deleted film version of The Jitterbug, albeit without its full intro, as a bonus track. In 1998, to coincide with a digitally restored and remastered theatrical reissue, the album was reissued on Rhino Records as The Songs and Story of the Wizard of Oz. The album was edited from the digital stereo soundtrack of the film's 1998 re-release, created from surviving multiple recording stems, and as such was the first album to feature many of the songs in stereo sound.

MGM 1963 Studio Album

In 1963, MGM Records issued an entirely new LP recording featuring four selections from The Wizard of Oz, this one a true cover version with none of the film's cast. Also included on the album were selections from Victor Herbert's Babes in Toyland. This album quickly sank into obscurity and has never been issued on CD. It featured such artists as Jackson Beck.

Rhino Records Deluxe Soundtrack Album
In 1995, all previous albums of The Wizard of Oz were supplanted by Rhino Records' extensive, new 2-CD soundtrack album featuring not only all the songs, but also all of Herbert Stothart's background music, as well as outtake pieces of music, the opening and closing credits music, all of the songs cut from the film following its sneak previews, and demos for the songs.  (See track listing below.) In all, this album played for well over two hours, longer than the actual film. All of the songs and music, except for the demos, were presented in the exact order that they would have been heard in the film had it not been slightly trimmed before release.

The 1995 album contains no spoken dialogue. One vocal not heard on the album is the guards' chanting of "O – Ee– Oh! Yeoo – Oh!" outside the Wicked Witch's castle since only the instrumental music track is included. Also unheard is the "Lions and tigers and bears!" chant. Another oddity is that although a full track of the "Cyclone" instrumental is used, in lieu of the film's shortened soundtrack which has an audible edit, only one of the two tracks for the segment was located, so the mix is different from the "normal" version.

A single-disc version was also produced, containing only the vocal selections, the main title, the "Cyclone" instrumental, and the score for the final scene where Dorothy goes home. The single-disc still contained all of the vocal outtakes, with the exception of the "Over The Rainbow" reprise, and extended versions of songs but discarded almost all of the background score. Despite the existence of multi-track recordings, which had been made to create a more full and balanced monaural track for the film, none of the music on either release was mixed in stereo.

In 1998, when the film received a complete digital video and audio restoration, including a new stereo mix, Rhino Records released The Songs and Story of "The Wizard of Oz", which expanded the 1956 MGM album even further, taking off The Jitterbug, adding the deleted dance music from "If I Only Had a Brain", and including additional bits of dialogue absent from previous releases. This was also the first time that the Oz songs were made available on CD in stereo, some in simulated stereo, and some in true stereo thanks to the existence of most of MGM's original multi-track recordings of the music from the film.

Music in the film
Vocals composed for the film
Over the Rainbow – Judy Garland
Come Out, Come Out, Wherever You Are – Billie Burke / The Munchkins / Singer's Midgets
It Really was No Miracle – Judy Garland and the Munchkins
We Thank You Very Sweetly – The Munchkins
Ding-Dong! The Witch Is Dead – The Munchkins
As Mayor of the Munchkin City – The Munchkins (Billy Bletcher, Pinto Colvig)
As Coroner I Must Aver – The Munchkin Coroner (Meinhardt Raabe)
The Lullaby League – Three Munchkin girls (Betty Rome, Carol Tevis, Lorraine Bridges)
The Lollipop Guild – Three Munchkin boys (Billy Bletcher, Jerry Maren, Pinto Colvig)
We Welcome You to Munchkinland – The Munchkins
You're Off to See the Wizard – The Munchkins
If I Only Had a Brain – Ray Bolger / Judy Garland
We're Off to See the Wizard – Judy Garland /Ray Bolger / Buddy Ebsen (pre-recorded) / Bert Lahr
If I Only had a Heart – Jack Haley Adriana Caselotti
If I Only had the Nerve – Cowardly Lion (Bert Lahr)
Optimistic Voices – unseen chorus
The Merry Old Land of Oz – Frank Morgan / Judy Garland / Ray Bolger / Bert Lahr / Jack Haley / Citizens of the Emerald City
If I Were King of the Forest – Bert Lahr / Judy Garland / Ray Bolger / Jack Haley
The Jitterbug (cut from the film) – Judy Garland / Ray Bolger / Jack Haley / Bert Lahr
Over the Rainbow (Reprise) (cut from the film) – Judy Garland
Hail Hail the Witch is Dead / The Merry Old Land of Oz (Reprise) (cut from the film) – Head Winkie Guard (dubbed by Ken Darby) / Citizens of the Emerald City

Instrumentals in the film
In addition to the well-known vocals by Harburg and Arlen, nearly the entire film was underscored by arranger Herbert Stothart, using a mixture of instrumental-only leitmotifs composed for some of the characters, instrumental references to some of the vocals, and traditional and classical pieces. Much of the following information (which is by no means an exhaustive list) is taken from the Deluxe CD liner notes.

Composed for the film
Opening credits medley: Glinda's theme, dynamic full-orchestra version, played over the MGM Leo the Lion logo; followed by segments of "Ding, Dong, the Witch is Dead" played slowly and majestically, so that the song is almost unrecognizable; they lead into a triumphant, full-orchestra version of "Over the Rainbow", then we hear "It Really Was No Miracle", a triumphant version of "Come Out, Come Out, Wherever You Are", and "It Really Was No Miracle" again, followed by original music while the film's foreword appears on the screen.
Miss Gulch's / Witch's theme – repeated every time Miss Gulch or the witch appears. This repeated seven-note motif is actually a "crippled" variation (inverted and compressed in range) of the musical figure for "We're off to see the Wizard".
Orientale theme – for Professor Marvel and for The Wizard
Glinda's theme – 6-note pattern repeated several times rapidly each time Glinda arrives or leaves in her bubble: G, D, E, B-flat, G, C-sharp.
Closing credits medley: Glinda's theme (full orchestra) / Over the Rainbow

Music not composed specifically for the film
"The Happy Farmer", i.e. Fröhlicher Landmann, von der Arbeit zurückkehrend, "The Happy Farmer Returning from Work" from Schumann's Album for the Young – opening scene, establishing scenes in Kansas, and during "ride" in cyclone
"My Castle's in the Courtyard" (nursery rhyme) – in sequence leading up to "Over the Rainbow"
"The Whistler and His Dog" (by Septimus Winner) a.k.a. "Oh Where, Oh Where Has My Little Dog Gone?" – when Toto escapes from Miss Gulch's basket as she pedals on her bicycle to the sheriff
"In the Shade of the Old Apple Tree" (by Harry Williams and Egbert Van Alstyne) – when Dorothy and the Scarecrow find themselves in an apple orchard
Scherzo Opus 16 #2 (by Mendelssohn) – when Toto escapes from the castle
"Night on Bald Mountain" (by Mussorgsky) – during chase scenes at the witch's castle
"Gaudeamus Igitur" (traditional) – a few bars when the Wizard awards the Scarecrow his honorary degree
"Home! Sweet Home!" (by John Howard Payne and Henry Bishop) – as Dorothy says the words and clicks her heels, and in the final scene in Kansas. In the final moments of this scene, a horn intones "Home Sweet Home" in counterpoint to the final strain of "Over The Rainbow."

Track listing for Rhino deluxe edition

This set does not include any spoken dialogue. Its main purpose is to present the songs as well as the pure audio background music from the movie. The set is quite extensive because it contains many "extended versions" of songs and background music with which most people are familiar. All of the songs from the movie are presented on the set in their full and even some extended, vocal versions. Vocal tracks are identified (vocal) in bold type; other tracks are instrumentals.

Disc one
Main Title
Trouble in School – (extended version)
Farmyard – (outtake)
Over the Rainbow – vocal
Miss Gulch – (extended version)
Leaving Home
Crystal Gazing
Cyclone – (extended version)
Munchkinland
I'm Not a Witch
Come Out, Come Out ... – vocal
It Really Was No Miracle – vocal
We Thank You Very Sweetly – vocal
Ding-Dong! The Witch Is Dead – vocal
As Mayor of the Munchkin City – vocal
As Coroner, I Must Aver – vocal
Ding-Dong! The Witch Is Dead (Reprise) – vocal
Lullaby League, The – vocal
Lollipop Guild, The – vocal
We Welcome You to Munchkinland – vocal
Threatening Witch – (extended version)
Leaving Munchkinland
Good Fairy Vanishes
Follow The Yellow Brick Road / You're Off To See The Wizard – vocal
Cornfield, The
If I Only Had a Brain – (extended version) – vocal
We're Off to See the Wizard – (duo) – vocal
Apple Orchard, The – (extended version)
If I Only Had a Heart – (extended version) – vocal
Witch on Roof – (extended version)
Bees & Tin Woodman Lament – (partial outtake)
We're Off to See the Wizard – (trio) – vocal
Into the Forest of Wild Beasts
Lion's Confession, The – (outtake)
If I Only Had the Nerve – vocal
We're Off to See the Wizard – (quartet) – vocal
Poppies
Spell, The – (extended version)
Optimistic Voices – vocal
Sign On The Gate / The City Gates Open – (extended version)
Merry Old Land of Oz, The – vocal
Change Of The Guard (Outtake) / Wizard's Exit
If I Were King of the Forest – vocal
At the Gates of Emerald City – (extended version)
Magic Smoke Chords
Terrified Lion
 
Disc two
Haunted Forest, The – (extended version)
Jitterbug, The – (outtake) – vocal
Jitterbug's Attack, The – (extended version)
Witch's Castle, The – (extended version)
Toto Brings News
 Over The Rainbow (Reprise) – vocal (outtake)
March of the Winkies
Dorothy's Rescue – (extended version)
On the Castle Wall – (extended version)
Ding-Dong! Emerald City – vocal (outtake)
The Wizard's Expose / Emerald City Graduation Exercises
Fill-In Awards / I Was Floating Through Space / Balloon Ascension / Second Cheer
I Hereby Decree
Delirious Escape / Delirious Escape Continued / End Title
Main Title – (alternate take with unused tag)
Over the Rainbow – (partial take) – vocal
Over the Rainbow – (alternate take) – vocal
Cyclone – (final film version)
Munchkinland Insert – (alternate tag)
I'm Not a Witch – (alternate version)
Munchkinland Musical Sequence – (rehearsal demo) – vocal
Ding-Dong! The Witch Is Dead – (alternate a cappella choir version) – vocal
Lollipop Guild, The – (original Munchkin actors' voices) – vocal
Follow The Yellow Brick Road / You're Off To See The Wizard – (orchestral angles)
If I Only Had a Brain – (unused dance music)
If I Only Had a Heart – (unused version) – vocal by Buddy Ebsen
Lion's Confession, The – (alternate take outtake/ alternate arrangement)
Poppies – (alternate version with heavenly choir)
Optimistic Voices – (rehearsal demo) – vocal
Optimistic Voices – (alternate vocal arrangement) – vocal
Merry Old Land of Oz, The – (orchestral angles)
If I Were King of the Forest – (alternate take partial take/alternate vocal tag) – vocal
If I Were King of the Forest – (alternate vocal tag) – vocal
Jitterbug, The – (choreography rehearsal) – vocal
Over the Rainbow (Reprise) – (outtake/ alternate version) – vocal
Ding Dong! Emerald City – (alternate version) – vocal
End Title – (alternate version)

Other studio cast albums
Many other studio cast albums of the songs from the film (aside from the 1940 and 1963 ones) have appeared over the past fifty years, most of them fairly obscure and never issued on compact disc. Golden Records released a seven-minute 45-rpm album of the story with four songs from the film, narrated by Art Carney. The music was sung and played by the Mitch Miller Chorus and Orchestra.

See also
 Stage musicals using most of the songs from the film:
The Wizard of Oz (1942 musical)
The Wizard of Oz (1987 musical)
The Wizard of Oz (2011 musical)

Notes

References

External links
The Judy Garland Online Discography Wizard of Oz soundtrack pages
The Judy Garland Online Discography Wizard of Oz on Decca Records pages

Film music
The Wizard of Oz (1939 film)
Compositions by Herbert Stothart
Scores that won the Best Original Score Academy Award